František Fuka (pronounced ) (October 9, 1968 in Prague) is a Czech computer programmer and musician. He currently works as a film translator, preparing English-language movies for Czech release. He is known also as a film critic, publicist and commentator.

František Fuka is one of the pioneers of blogging in the Czech Republic. His website FFFilm gradually became one of the important sources among Czech film sites. The newspaper Lidové noviny ranked him among the top six influential personalities of the Czech internet in 2004.

František Fuka is a member of one of the oldest-running Czech radio podcasts, Odvážné palce.

Games for ZX Spectrum 

Fuka has developed several video games for the ZX Spectrum with the Czechoslovakian programming group Golden Triangle. As a member of the group, he was introduced in 2016 to the Czech video game Hall of Fame. Fuka has also been noted as an influence on other Slovak game developers.

 Belegost (Along with Miroslav Fídler)
 Boxing
 Poklad
 Poklad 2
 Bowling 2000
 Indiana Jones a Chrám zkázy
 Indiana Jones 2
 Indiana Jones 3
 Jet-Story (Along with Miroslav Fídler)
 Kaboom!
 Planet of Shades (Along with Miroslav Fídler)
 Podraz 3
 F.I.R.E.
 Tetris 2

Bibliography

References

External links

 Homepage F. Fuka
 František Fuka: I distributoři si musí filmy stahovat z internetu (Interview - 30minut.cz)
 Kulturní tri@log: Baldýnský, Fila a Fuka o Oscarech Aktuálně.cz)
 Co se v životě naučil František Fuka (Super.cz)
 František Fuka: Nikdy jsem nebyl v USA (Kinobox.cz)
 Fuxoft's Blog 

Video game composers
1968 births
Living people
Czech bloggers
Male bloggers
Czech translators
Czech video game designers
Video game programmers
21st-century translators